Tawatwong Na Chiang Mai (December 14, 1945- ) is a Thailand politician who served as Thailand's Deputy Minister of Finance from 1996 until 1997, Deputy Minister of Public Health from 1996 until 1997 and the Deputy Minister of Foreign Affairs 1997.

History
Tawatwong Na Chiang Mai was born on December 14, 1945. He is the son of Chao Chaisuriwong Na Chiang Mai and Mae Tem. He had the nickname "Chaonuy." In 1952 he began his studies at Montfort College in Chiang Mai and in 1965 he transferred to the North Carolina State University in North Carolina.

Royal decorations
  Knight Grand Cordon (Special Class) of the Most Exalted Order of the White Elephant
  Knight Grand Cordon (Special Class) of The Most Noble Order of the Crown of Thailand

References

1945 births
Living people
Tawatwong na Chiang Mai
Tawatwong na Chiang Mai
Tawatwong na Chiang Mai
Tawatwong na Chiang Mai
Tawatwong na Chiang Mai
North Carolina State University alumni
Tawatwong na Chiang Mai
Tawatwong na Chiang Mai
Tawatwong na Chiang Mai
Tawatwong na Chiang Mai
Tawatwong na Chiang Mai